Samba Cajú is a town and municipality in Cuanza Norte Province in Angola. The municipality had a population of 21,918 in 2014.

References

Populated places in Cuanza Norte Province
Municipalities of Angola